Backup Corners is an unincorporated community in Warren County, Pennsylvania, United States.

Conewango Creek flows on the eastern boundary of the settlement.

A now-abandoned track of the Dunkirk, Allegheny Valley and Pittsburgh Railroad, completed in the early 1870s, passes through the settlement.

References

Unincorporated communities in Warren County, Pennsylvania
Unincorporated communities in Pennsylvania